Lochham station is a railway station in the municipality of Gräfelfing, in Bavaria, Germany. It is located on the Munich–Garmisch-Partenkirchen railway of Deutsche Bahn.

Services
 the following services stop at Lochham:

References

External links
 
 Lochham layout 
 

Railway stations in Bavaria
Buildings and structures in Munich (district)
Munich S-Bahn stations